Mordellistena magyarica is a species of beetle in the family Mordellidae which is in the superfamily Tenebrionoidea. It was discovered in 1977 and can be found in Austria and Hungary.

References

magyarica
Beetles described in 1977
Beetles of Europe